Rocío de la Mancha is a 1963 album by the Spanish singer and actress Rocío Dúrcal as the soundtrack album of the 1963 film of the same name.

Songs 
 "Alegrias de Rocio"
 "Canción de San Roque"
 "Nubes de Colores"
 "Don Quijote"
 "Canta Conmigo"
 "Que Tengas Suerte"
 "Mi Señora Dulcinea"
 "Viva Buffalo Bill"

1963 albums
Rocío Dúrcal albums
Spanish-language albums